Huancaraylla District is one of twelve districts of the Víctor Fajardo Province in Peru.

Geography 
Other mountains are listed below:

Ethnic groups 
The people in the district are mainly indigenous citizens of Quechua descent. Quechua is the language which the majority of the population (92.34%) learnt to speak in childhood, 7.54% of the residents started speaking using the Spanish language (2007 Peru Census).

See also 
 Wamanilla

References

Wankaraylla, distrito donde nació el Cronista Indio Guaman Puma de Ayala. Perteneció al curato de Willkawaman en el Virreynato. Tiene un clima templado y sol todo el año. Sus hijos más ilustres son Casimiro Yaranga y Abdón Yaranga V.